Abhinay Vaddi is an Indian actor who works predominantly in Tamil-language films.

Career 
Abhinay Vaddi made his film debut with the Telugu film Young India (2010) directed by Dasari Narayana Rao. He was set to make his Tamil debut with Vilambaram, but the delay of the film meant that the biographical film Ramanujan, based on the mathematician, was his debut film in Tamil. He was awarded the role after a series of auditions which had prominent actors from the Tamil film industry. Akin to Ramanujan, Vaddi is also good at math. Each scene was shot first in Tamil and then in English, with changes made between the versions due to the different theatrical audience. A critic from The Indian Express cited that "the highlight of the film is that it has a talented debutant playing Ramanujan to the hilt. You could see Ramanujan in Vaddi, literally, and his portrayal of the genius is nearly flawless". Vaddi played a negative cameo role in Chennai 600028 II. He will play the lead role in Michaelagiya Naan, which is a psychological thriller and stars Vasundhara Kashyap and Malobika Banerjee. Vaddi also plays the Protagonist in Sugar starring Simran and Trisha. He is paired opposite Simran in the film .

Personal life 
Abhinay Vaddi's grandfather is Gemini Ganesan and his grandmother is Nadigaiyar Thilagam (Mahanati) Savithri. Abhinay was also a National Level table tennis player and now is a High Performance Table Tennis Coach and trains State and National Level professional athletes in the sport of Table Tennis.  He has avid interest in agriculture and farming and runs his own farm in Chennai following the new aspects of agriculture like Polyhouse Farming.

Filmography 
All films are in Tamil, unless otherwise noted.

Television

Awards and nominations

References

External links 

Living people
Male actors in Tamil cinema
Male actors in Telugu cinema
21st-century Indian male actors
Bigg Boss (Tamil TV series) contestants
Year of birth missing (living people)